Bowlliards is a pool game often used as a training . The game borrows aspects of ten-pin bowling, hence the name. The game is divided into ten frames where a player gets a maximum of two innings to  ten balls.

Gameplay
After the break the player gets  and tries to pocket as many balls as possible until missing. This is considered the first  of the frame. If there are still balls left on the table after the first inning, the player gets a second inning to attempt to finish clearing the table. Clearing all the balls on the first inning is called a strike, clearing any remaining balls on the second inning is called a spare. For details on scoring see the scoring section for ten-pin bowling.

References

Pool (cue sports)